Edward Hinton (20 May 1922 – 11 October 1988) was a Northern Irish international footballer who played as a goalkeeper in the Football League. He was famed for keeping his false teeth in the back of his net when he played.

References

External links
Ted Hinton's Career
Biography on "Northern Ireland Footballing Greats" website

1922 births
1988 deaths
Association footballers from Northern Ireland
Northern Ireland international footballers
Fulham F.C. players
Lisburn Distillery F.C. players
Bangor F.C. players
Millwall F.C. players
Ballymena United F.C. players
Glentoran F.C. players
English Football League players
Association football goalkeepers
Pre-1950 IFA international footballers